Rock Around the Bunker is a 1975 studio album by French singer and songwriter Serge Gainsbourg, containing songs which combined pseudo-1950s musical arrangements with lyrics relating to Nazi Germany and World War II and drawing from Gainsbourg's experiences as a Jewish child in occupied France.

Track listing

Personnel
Credits adapted from liner notes.

 Serge Gainsbourg – vocals, piano, guitar, arrangement
 Kay Garner – vocals
 Jean Hawker – vocals
 Jim Lawless – percussion
 Brian Odgers – bass
 Alan Parker – guitar
 Judd Proctor – guitar
 Clare Torry – vocals
 Dougie Wright – drums
 Alan Hawkshaw – piano, arrangement

References

External links
 
 

1975 albums
Serge Gainsbourg albums